Riot City Wrestling (RCW) is an Australian independent professional wrestling promotion founded in January 2006 in Adelaide, South Australia. It runs shows independently, in conjunction with local festivals, as well as with other organizations and wrestling promotions.

History
Riot City Wrestling was founded in Adelaide in January 2006. In 2010, RCW appeared at the Adelaide Fringe, hosting the STRENGTH Cup tournament, and was voted one of the festival's top five attractions by the Adelaide Advertiser. They returned to the festival in 2011, hosting the tournament again. For the 2014 festival, the company promoted a lucha libre-themed show.

On 1 July 2012, the Goodwood Saints Football Club of the South Australian Amateur Football League hosted RCW for a special fundraiser. RCW wrestlers the Basso Boys, who competed at the event, had previously played C Grade Australian Rules Football.
As of August 2014, Jeff Jarrett's American-based Global Force Wrestling announced working agreements with Riot City Wrestling. That month, during a WWE tour of Australia, several RCW wrestlers were also invited to participate in a WWE training camp.

Wrestling reviewer Rod Lewis has noted the promotion for its "high octane acrobatics" as well as  "the comical theatrics and surprising plot twists". RCW has built an alliance with Melbourne City Wrestling, which has featured a rivalry between wrestlers from the two promotions.

RCW runs a training academy, which is located in Kilkenny. Wrestlers who have competed for RCW include former NXT tag team champion Buddy Murphy, Voodoo, who competes for Grand Pro Wrestling, and WWE Raw Women's Champion Rhea Ripley.

Championships

RCW Championship

Reigns

Combined reigns

RCW Emerald Crown

Reigns

Combined reigns

RCW Women's Championship

Reigns

Combined reigns

RCW Tag Team Championship

Reigns

Combined Reigns

Accomplishments

Alumni 
 Demi Bennett
 Indi Hartwell
 Jonah Rock
 Matt Silva
 Matty Wahlberg

See also

 Professional wrestling in Australia
 List of professional wrestling organisations in Australia

Notes

References

External links 

Cagematch profile

Australian professional wrestling promotions
Sport in Adelaide
Entertainment companies established in 2006
2006 establishments in Australia
Companies based in Adelaide